Eelco Jansen (born 14 May 1969 in Heemskerk, North Holland) is a Dutch baseball player.

Jansen represented the Netherlands at the 1996 Summer Olympics in Atlanta where he and his team became sixth. Four years later at the 2000 Summer Olympics in Sydney they were fifth, while in Athens at the 2004 Summer Olympics they were sixth again.

External links
Jansen at the Dutch Olympic Archive

1969 births
Living people
People from Heemskerk
Baseball players at the 1996 Summer Olympics
Baseball players at the 2000 Summer Olympics
Baseball players at the 2004 Summer Olympics
Olympic baseball players of the Netherlands
Dutch baseball players
Sportspeople from North Holland